This list of tallest buildings in Chengdu ranks skyscrapers in the southwestern city of Chengdu, the capital of Sichuan, China by height. The tallest building in Chengdu is currently the Tianfu Times Tower and stands 180 m (590 feet) tall.

Chengdu is the second-largest city in Western China (after Chongqing) and is the provincial capital and the biggest city in Sichuan Province with a metro population over 11 million. The city is the political, cultural, financial, and transportation center of Sichuan and points to the West.

Even though Chengdu does not have as many skyscrapers as in the larger Chongqing, the city's urban area is larger due to the lack of geographical constraint. Chengdu is ranked by Skyscrapercity for the 14th best skyline in China and 49th in the world.

Located on the great Chengdu Plain, the land the city sits on is not fit for many tall high-rises. But over the years, when architecture and the materials for building developed, like many other developing Chinese cities, more and more skyscraper construction was seen around Chengdu. The history of skyscrapers in Chengdu first started in around 1990, when Chengdu saw its first great skyscraper construction boom. The Shu Capitol Building, completed in 1991, became Chengdu's first skyscraper. In the next three years, more than 20 skyscrapers were erected in the city; when the 160-meter Sichuan Bank of China Tower was completed in 1994, it became the tallest building in western China, surpassing the few skyscrapers then in Chongqing. In 1998, Chengdu's high-rise construction boom reached its peak once again; in the next decade, 15 skyscrapers taller than 100 meters were completed in the city. Chengdu currently has 28 skyscrapers taller than 100 meters completed in the city.

Tallest buildings

This lists ranks Chengdu skyscrapers that stand at least 150 m (492 feet) tall, based on standard height measurement. This includes spires and architectural details but does not include antenna masts. Existing structures are included for ranking purposes based on present height. All the structures in this list has been topped out, but some may not be ready to use.

Tallest under construction, approved, and proposed

Under construction
This lists buildings that are under construction in Chengdu and are planned to rise at least 120 m (328 feet). Buildings that have already been topped out are not included.

Proposed

References
General
Skycraperpage.com Chengdu

External links
 Chengdu skyscrapers on SkyscraperPage
 Tallest buildings of Chengdu on Emporis
 Skyscrapers of Chengdu on Gaoloumi (in Chinese)
 The World's best Skyline

Chengdu
Buildings and structures in Chengdu